CCTV-11 is the Chinese opera channel of the CCTV (China Central Television) Network in the People's Republic of China launched on July 9, 2001.

Programming
 Film and Television Theater
 Local Opera
 Pear Garden Appreciation 
 Studies with Me
 Famous Section Appreciation
 Play Park Hundred
 Theater in The Air
 Beijing Opera

External links
 Official Site 

China Central Television channels
Chinese opera
Television channels and stations established in 2001
2001 establishments in China